The lacrimal sac or lachrymal sac is the upper dilated end of the nasolacrimal duct, and is lodged in a deep groove formed by the lacrimal bone and frontal process of the maxilla. It connects the lacrimal canaliculi, which drain tears from the eye's surface, and the nasolacrimal duct, which conveys this fluid into the nasal cavity. Lacrimal sac occlusion leads to dacryocystitis.

Structure
It is oval in form and measures from 12 to 15 mm. in length; its upper end is closed and rounded; its lower is continued into the nasolacrimal duct.

Its superficial surface is covered by a fibrous expansion derived from the medial palpebral ligament, and its deep surface is crossed by the lacrimal part of the orbicularis oculi, which is attached to the crest on the lacrimal bone.

Histology
Like the nasolacrimal duct, the sac is lined by stratified columnar epithelium with mucus-secreting goblet cells, with surrounding connective tissue. The Lacrimal Sac also drains the eye of debris and microbes.

Function
It serves as a reservoir for overflow of tears, in which the lacrimal sac pumps inward and outward driven by the orbicularis muscle during blinking.

Imaging

The lacrimal sac can be imaged by dacrocystography, in which radiocontrast is injected, followed by X-ray imaging.

Additional images

See also
Lacrimal apparatus

References

Human eye anatomy